Conor McCarthy (born 1981 in Skibbereen, County Cork) is an Irish sportsperson. He played Gaelic football with his local club O'Donovan Rossa and was a member of the Cork senior county football team from 2005.

References

1981 births
Living people
O'Donovan Rossa (Cork) Gaelic footballers
Cork inter-county Gaelic footballers